Clyde Webster Sare (April 9, 1936 – February 8, 2015) was an American politician and businessman.

Born in Bartlesville, Oklahoma, Sare went to high school and to Oklahoma State University. He was in the storage and real estate business. From 1959 to 1963, Sare served in the Oklahoma House of Representatives as a Democrat. He died in Bartlesville, Oklahoma.

Notes

1936 births
2015 deaths
People from Bartlesville, Oklahoma
Oklahoma State University alumni
Businesspeople from Oklahoma
Democratic Party members of the Oklahoma House of Representatives
20th-century American businesspeople